Constantin Ionuț Ilie (born 19 September 1974), commonly known as Costel Ilie, is a Romanian former professional footballer who played as a midfielder. Ilie played for Ceahlăul in 268 matches, being one of the players with most presences in the yellow and black shirt of the team from Piatra Neamț, he also won a Liga I title in 2002 with Dinamo București. After retirement Costel Ilie started his football manager career and currently is the technical manager of Sporting Vaslui.

Honours

Club
Dinamo București
Divizia A: 2001–02

References

External links
 
 

1974 births
Living people
Sportspeople from Piatra Neamț
Romanian footballers
Association football midfielders
Liga I players
Liga II players
CSM Ceahlăul Piatra Neamț players
FC Dinamo București players
FC Vaslui players
Romanian football managers
CSM Ceahlăul Piatra Neamț managers
ACS Foresta Suceava managers